Alistair Beaton (born 1947) is a playwright and satirist, journalist, radio presenter, novelist and television writer. At one point in his career he was also a speechwriter for Gordon Brown.

Born in Glasgow, Scotland, Beaton was educated at the universities of Edinburgh, Moscow and Bochum and graduated from the University of Edinburgh with First-Class Honours in Russian and German. He lives in Holloway, London.

Works

Non-fiction

 The Thatcher Papers (1980)
 The Little Book of Complete Bollocks (1999)
 The Little Book of New Labour Bollocks (2000)
 The Little Book of Management Bollocks (2001)
 The Little Book of Brexit Bollocks (2019)

Fiction

 Don Juan on the Rocks (novel, 1994)
 Drop the Dead Donkey 2000 (novel, 1994) (co-authored with Andy Hamilton, after the British sitcom Drop the Dead Donkey)
A Planet for the President (novel, 2004)

Stage plays

 The Ratepayers' Iolanthe (co-written with Ned Sherrin) South Bank and Phoenix Theatre West End (1984)
 The Metropolitan Mikado (co-written with Ned Sherrin) South Bank (1985)
 King the Musical (lyrics, co-written with Maya Angelou) Piccadilly Theatre West End (1985)
 Feelgood (a satire on New Labour spin doctors) Hampstead Theatre and Garrick Theatre West End (2001)
 Follow My Leader (a musical about the Iraq War, music by Richard Blackford) Birmingham Repertory Theatre and Hampstead Theatre (2004)
 King of Hearts (a satire on the monarchy) Hampstead Theatre (2007)
 Caledonia (a musical satire about the Royal Bank of Scotland and the 17th century Darien Scheme) King's Theatre Edinburgh International Festival (2010) 
 Fracked: Or Please Don't Use The F Word (a climate change play) Chichester Festival Theatre and National Tour (2016/2017)
 The Accidental Leader Arts Theatre West End (2016)
 Alone in Berlin Royal & Derngate and York Theatre Royal (2020)

Translations and adaptations

 Nikolai Gogol's The Government Inspector (translated from the Russian) produced at the Chichester Festival Theatre, starring Alistair McGowan
 Gogol's The Nose (based on the Gogol short story of the same name)
 La Vie parisienne (operetta by Jacques Offenbach, translated from French)
 Die Fledermaus (from the German)
 The Arsonists (a 2007 version of the 1953 play Biedermann und die Brandstifter by Max Frisch)
 The Caucasian Chalk Circle (a 2010 translation of the play of the same name by Bertolt Brecht)
 The Resistible Rise of Arturo Ui (a 2013 version of the Bertolt Brecht play, Chichester Festival Theatre and Duchess Theatre, West End)

Television

 Not The Nine O'Clock News (1979–1982)
 It'll All Be Over in Half an Hour (1983)
 Spitting Image (1984–1996)
 Incident on the Line (from Tickets for the Titanic, 1987)
 The Way, the Truth, the Video (from Tickets for the Titanic, 1987)
 Downwardly Mobile (1994)
  (screenplay, 1998; based on a novel by )
 A Very Social Secretary (2005)
 The Trial of Tony Blair (2007)

Radio

 Fourth Column, a BBC Radio 4 show for writers and journalists
 Electric Ink, BBC Radio 4 starring Robert Lindsay (2009/2010)
 The Beaton Generation

Miscellaneous
 Consultant to Columbia TriStar Pictures 1991-1995
 Additional lyrics for the song "Small Titles And Orders" in the Chichester Festival Theatre's production of The Gondoliers in the summer of 2003.
 Consultant to stage musical Himmel und Kölle, Volksbühne, Cologne 2020/2021

External links
 Alistair Beaton: "Nanny Doesn't Know Best" (The Times, 29 March 2004) (about the war in Iraq and its treatment in Follow My Leader)
 "Lunatics in the White House? Surely not?" (Camden New Journal, 19 November 2004) (about the genesis of A Planet for the President; includes author photograph).

1947 births
Alumni of the University of Edinburgh
Living people
Scottish television writers
Moscow State University alumni
Environmental fiction writers
Scottish political journalists
Scottish satirists
Scottish radio presenters
Scottish novelists
Speechwriters
Writers from Glasgow
Scottish socialists
Ruhr University Bochum alumni
Scottish dramatists and playwrights